San Angelo Independent School District is a public school district based in San Angelo, Texas, United States.

As of 2015, San Angelo ISD has received a rating of "Met Standard" by the Texas Education Agency.

Schools
San Angelo ISD has 25 schools serving students Pre-K through 12th grade including one 5A (4A beginning in fall 2018) and one 6A high school, three middle schools, 17 elementary schools, and two alternative campuses. SAISD also serves children birth through age five at three Head Start/Early Head Start centers.

High schools
Central High School  (Grades 10-12)  (Website)
Lake View High School  (Grades 9-12) (Website)

Middle schools
Lincoln Middle School (grades 6-8) (Website)
Glenn Middle School (grades 6-8) (Website)
Lone Star Middle School (grades 6-8) (Website)

Elementary schools
Grades PK-5
Alta Loma Elementary School (Website)
Austin Elementary School (Website)
Bradford Elementary School (Website)
Fannin Elementary School (Website)
Glenmore Elementary School (Website)
McGill Elementary School (Website)
Reagan Elementary School (Website)
Grades K-5
Belaire Elementary School (Website)
Bonham Elementary School (Website)
Bowie Elementary School (Website)
Crockett Elementary School (Website)
Fort Concho Elementary School (Website)
Goliad Elementary School (Website)
Holiman Elementary School (Website)
Lamar Elementary School (Website)
San Jacinto Elementary School (Website)
Santa Rita Elementary School (Website)

Head Start/Early Childhood Centers
Early Head Start/Head Start provides comprehensive child development services to economically disadvantaged children and families who meet the poverty income guidelines, with a special focus on helping children from birth to age five develop the early reading and math skills they need to be successful in school.
Blackshear Head Start (Ages 3–5 yrs.)
Day Head Start/Early Head Start (Ages 0–5 yrs.)
Rio Vista Head Start/Early Head Start (Ages 0–5 yrs.)

Alternative schools
Carver Learning Center (Grades 1-12) - Carver Learning Center is a disciplinary alternative education program for students who have been withdrawn from his/her home campus for infractions to school code of conduct. Teachers work to help the students get caught up with or maintain his/her grade level and build foundation skills to enable the student to succeed academically when he/she returns to his/her home campus. (Website)
PAYS - PAYS is an academic alternative school for non-traditional students motivated to complete their high school diploma but are enduring extenuating circumstances that pose as obstacles to their academic success. PAYS is a self-paced, web-based program providing students the opportunity to accrue credits to progress to graduation.  (Website)

References

External links

San Angelo ISD

 
School districts in Texas